The 2004–05 Ohio Bobcats men's basketball team represented Ohio University in the college basketball season of 2004–05. The team was coached by Tim O'Shea and played their home games at the Convocation Center.  They finished the season 21–11 and 11–7 in MAC play to finish in a five way tie for second place and one game behind champion Miami.  As the four-seed in the MAC tournament they beat Miami in the semi-finals and defeated Buffalo in overtime in the final. Leon Williams of Ohio was named the tournament MVP.  They represented the MAC in the NCAA tournament. There they lost in the first round to Florida.

Roster

Coaching staff

Preseason
The preseason poll was announced by the league office on October 21, 2004.

Preseason men's basketball poll
Buffalo was picked by the media to win the East. Toledo was picked to win the West.

Schedule and results
Source: 

|-
!colspan=9 style=| Regular Season

|-
|-
|-
|-
|-
|-
|-
|-
|-
|-
|-
|-
|-
|-
|-
|-
|-
|-
|-
|-
|-
|-
|-
|-
|-
|-
|-
!colspan=9 style=| MAC Tournament
|-
|-
|-
|-
|-
!colspan=9 style=|  NCAA tournament
|-
|-

Statistics

Team Statistics
Final 2004–05 Statistics

Source

Player statistics

Source

Awards and honors

All-MAC Awards

Source

References

Ohio Bobcats men's basketball seasons
Ohio
Ohio
Bob
Bob